The Ellerbach is a right tributary of the river Saale. It flows through the districts Burgenlandkreis and Saalekreis of Saxony-Anhalt and flows into the Saale near Bad Dürrenberg.

Places on the Ellerbach are Schweßwitz (a district of Röcken), Ellerbach (a district of Tollwitz), Tollwitz and Bad Dürrenberg.

See also
List of rivers of Saxony-Anhalt

External links
 http://www.lebendigesaale.de/
  Der Kiebitz 2/01 - Vol 62: Pflege- und Entwicklungskonzeption für den Ellerbach
 https://web.archive.org/web/20070808035423/http://www.aha-halle.de/projektellerbach.pdf

Rivers of Saxony-Anhalt
Rivers of Germany